The Shepaug River is a  river in western Connecticut, in the United States.

The river originates at the south end of the Shepaug Reservoir in the town of Warren. The reservoir is fed at its northern end by the West Branch Shepaug River and East Branch Shepaug River. The Shepaug runs south through Washington, Roxbury, and Southbury, where it joins the Housatonic River at Lake Lillinonah dammed by the hydroelectric Shepaug Dam.

The vicinity of the Shepaug River has been inhabited by humans since around 4000 B.C., though according to archaeology, there was a decline in population around 1000 B.C.

The river is a primary source of drinking water for the city of Waterbury, and has been the subject of regional litigation over how much water may be removed from the river.

References

Rivers of Litchfield County, Connecticut
Rivers of Connecticut
Connecticut placenames of Native American origin
Tributaries of Housatonic River